The Petrus en Pauluskerk is a church in Loppersum, Netherlands. It is a rijksmonument and in the Top 100 Dutch heritage sites.

References 

Churches in Groningen (province)
Rijksmonuments in Groningen (province)
Eemsdelta